Jason Wynyard  is a champion woodchopper from Kawakawa in New Zealand who has won over a hundred world titles in the sport. Of Māori ancestry, he relates to the Ngāti Maniapoto and Ngāpuhi iwi. He attended High School at Waitākere College.

Wynyard has won the individual world championship nine times. He holds the world record for Single Buck (with assistant) with a time of 9.39 in 2007.

Wynyard won the Stihl Timbersports Series 14 times. He won the title in 1997, 1998, 1999, 2000, 2002, 2006, 2009, 2010, 2011, 2012, 2014, 2015, 2016 and 2017. 

In the 2017 New Year Honours, Wynyard was appointed a Member of the New Zealand Order of Merit, for services to the sport of wood chopping.

Wynyard is the father of former Kentucky University men's basketball player Tai Wynyard.

References

Year of birth missing (living people)
Living people
New Zealand woodchoppers
Members of the New Zealand Order of Merit
New Zealand Māori sportspeople
People from Kawakawa, New Zealand
Ngāti Maniapoto people
Ngāpuhi people